Aegialia cartwrighti is a species of aphodiine dung beetle in the family Scarabaeidae. It is found in North America.

References

Further reading

External links

 

Scarabaeidae
Beetles described in 1977